Kaarle Pekkala (4 October 1919 – 18 June 2000) was a Finnish sports shooter. He competed in the 50 metre pistol event at the 1960 Summer Olympics.

References

1919 births
2000 deaths
Finnish male sport shooters
Olympic shooters of Finland
Shooters at the 1960 Summer Olympics
Sportspeople from Vyborg